Omprakash Yadav is a Nepalese politician, belonging to the Madhesi Janadhikar Forum. In the 2008 Constituent Assembly election he was elected from the Rupandehi-6 constituency, winning 12170 votes.

References 

Living people
Madhesi Jana Adhikar Forum, Nepal politicians
Year of birth missing (living people)

Members of the 1st Nepalese Constituent Assembly
Place of birth missing (living people)